Somerset NHS Foundation Trust is a NHS foundation trust providing services for NHS England in Somerset, England. It manages a number of hospitals providing mental, community and acute hospital care across the county.

In November 2020 it was reported to be planning a merger with Yeovil District Hospital NHS Foundation Trust, which would create England’s first provider of primary, acute, community and mental health care services.

Hospitals
The trust manages Musgrove Park Hospital, mental health units in Bridgwater, Taunton and Wells, and 12 community hospitals:

History
The trust was formed from the merger of Somerset Partnership NHS Foundation Trust and Taunton and Somerset NHS Foundation Trust on 1 April 2020.

In September 2021 it opened a new diagnostic centre on the outskirts of Taunton near the M5, operating in partnership with Rutherford Health. This  will provide CT scans, magnetic resonance imaging, X-rays, ultrasound and other imaging services.  The trust pay a tariff price for activity and is reimbursed for the use of its staff. Rutherford Health  went into liquidation in June 2022 and a new contract was made with Alliance Medical.

See also
 Healthcare in Somerset
 List of NHS trusts

References

External links
 

NHS foundation trusts
Health in Somerset
Organisations based in Taunton